Before the Acts of Union 1707, the barons of the shire of Selkirk (also called Ettrick Forest) elected commissioners to represent them in the unicameral Parliament of Scotland and in the Convention of the Estates.

From 1708 Selkirkshire was represented by one Member of Parliament in the House of Commons of Great Britain.

List of shire commissioners
 1607: Sir Robert Scott of Thirlestane
 1612: Sir Gideon Murray of Elibank
 1612: Sir John Murray of Philiphaugh and Falahill
 1617: Sir Patrick Murray of Elibank, 1st Baronet
 1617, 1621: George Pringle of Torwoodlee
 1621, 1630: Sir James Pringle of Galashiels
 1633: Sir James Murray of Philiphaugh and Falahill
 1633: James Pringle of Whytbank
 1639–40: Andrew Riddell of Haining
 1639–41, 1643: Robert Scott of Whitslade
 1641, 1645: James Pringle of Torwoodlee
 1641, 1643–44, 1644–46: Sir William Scott of Harden
 1644–45: Robert Scott of Hartwoodmyres
 1645–47, 1650–51: Sir Walter Scott of Whitslade
 1646–47, 1648–49: Colonel Walter Scott of Hartwoodburn
 1648–49: Patrick Scott of Thirlestane
 1650: Sir William Scott of Harden
 1661: Sir John Murray of Philiphaugh
 1661–63: Thomas Scott of Whitslade
 1665 convention: John Riddell of Haining
 1665 convention, 1667 convention, 1669–74: Patrick Murray of Deuchar
 1667 convention: William Scott of Hartwoodmyres
 1669–74, 1685–86, 1693–1701: Sir Francis Scott of Thirlestane
 1678: John Riddell of Haining
 1678 convention, 1681–82: James Murray of Philiphaugh
 1681–82: Hugh Scott of Galashiels 
 1685–86: Sir William Hay of Drumelzier, privy counsellor
 1689–90: Sir William Scott the younger of Harden (expelled 1693)
 1689: George Pringle of Torwoodlee (died 1689) 
 1693–1701: James Pringle of Torwoodlee
 1702: Sir James Murray of Philiphaugh; elected for Selkirkshire but sat instead as Lord Clerk Register
 1702–07: John Murray of Bowhill
 1703–07: John Pringle of Haining (replacing Philiphaugh)

See also
 List of constituencies in the Parliament of Scotland at the time of the Union

References
 Margaret M. Young, The Parliaments of Scotland: Burgh and Shire Commissioners (Edinburgh, 1993) vol. 2, pp. 799–800.

Constituencies of the Parliament of Scotland (to 1707)
Constituencies disestablished in 1707
1707 disestablishments in Scotland